The following is a list of the 503 communes of the Dordogne department of France.

The communes cooperate in the following intercommunalities (as of 2020):
Communauté d'agglomération Bergeracoise
Communauté d'agglomération Le Grand Périgueux
Communauté de communes des Bastides Dordogne-Périgord
Communauté de communes Castillon-Pujols (partly)
Communauté de communes de Domme-Villefranche du Périgord
Communauté de communes Dronne et Belle
Communauté de communes Isle et Crempse en Périgord
Communauté de communes Isle Double Landais
Communauté de communes Isle-Loue-Auvézère en Périgord
Communauté de communes Isle, Vern, Salembre en Périgord
Communauté de communes de Montaigne Montravel et Gurson
Communauté de communes du Pays de Fénelon
Communauté de communes du Pays Foyen (partly)
Communauté de communes du Pays de Saint-Aulaye
Communauté de communes Périgord-Limousin
Communauté de communes du Périgord Nontronnais
Communauté de communes du Périgord Ribéracois
Communauté de communes des Portes Sud Périgord
Communauté de communes Sarlat-Périgord noir
Communauté de communes du Terrassonnais en Périgord noir Thenon Hautefort
Communauté de communes Vallée de la Dordogne et Forêt Bessède
Communauté de communes de la Vallée de l'Homme

References

Dordogne